Zappas may refer to:

 Evangelos Zappas, Greek philanthropist and businessman
 The Zappas Olympics, athletic competitions organized by Evangelos Zappas
 Petros Zappas, Greek entrepreneur and politician
 Konstantinos Zappas, Greek entrepreneur and national benefactor

See also
 Zappa (surname)
 Iason Sappas

Greek-language surnames